Eduard Van Ende (19 December 1926 – 9 February 2008) was a Belgian racing cyclist. He rode in the 1950 Tour de France.

References

1926 births
2008 deaths
Belgian male cyclists
Place of birth missing
20th-century Belgian people